The 1997–98 Eliteserien season was the 59th season of ice hockey in Norway. Ten teams participated in the league, and Valerenga Ishockey won the championship.

Regular season

Playoffs

Relegation 
 Jar IL - Furuset IF 1:2 (2:1, 2:7, 3:7)

External links
Season on hockeyarchives.info

GET-ligaen seasons
Norway
GET